Caitlin Dickerson is an American journalist. She is a reporter for The Atlantic, focused on immigration. She previously worked as a national reporter for The New York Times, a political analyst for CNN, and an investigative reporter for NPR. She was awarded a 2015 Peabody Award for an NPR special series on the testing of mustard gas on American troops in WWII.

Career 
Dickerson began her professional career as an intern at NPR. Following her internship, she worked at NPR as a producer, before landing a role on NPR's Investigations Desk.

In 2016, Dickerson reported on the testing of mustard gas by the U.S. military on American troops during WWII, in which subjects were grouped by race. Her reporting, published as a two-part special investigation by NPR, revealed that the Department of Veteran Affairs had broken promises it had made in the 1990s to seek out and provide compensation to veterans who had suffered permanent injuries as a result of the testing. Congress reacted to the report by calling for investigations and hearings, ultimately leading to the passage of a law to compensate test subjects. For their work, Dickerson and her investigative team were awarded a 2015 Peabody Award and a 2016 RTDNA National Edward R. Murrow Award.

In 2016, Dickerson joined the staff of The New York Times as a national immigration reporter. Dickerson broke several stories for the Times on the deportation and detention of undocumented immigrants. In June 2019 she reported on crowding and unsanitary conditions at a border station facility housing hundreds of children.

Dickerson has been a frequent guest on the news podcast The Daily and has hosted several episodes.

 Dickerson was a staff writer for The Atlantic magazine.

See also
 New Yorkers in journalism

References

21st-century American journalists
African-American women journalists
African-American journalists
American political journalists
American women journalists
CNN people
Living people
The New York Times writers
California State University, Long Beach alumni
Year of birth missing (living people)
21st-century American women
21st-century African-American women
21st-century African-American people